Kedamangalam Ali was an Indian actor in Malayalam movies during the 1960s and 1970s. Born in 1932 in Kedamangalam near North Paravur in Ernakulam District, Kerala, his popular movies are Mudiyanaaya Puthran (1961), Ninamaninja Kaalppaadukal (1963), Moodupadam (1963), Ammaye Kaanaan (1963) and Bhargaveenilayam (1964). He died on 26 April 1986.

Partial filmography
 Mudiyanaya Puthran (1961)
 Ninamaninja Kalpadukal (1963)
 Moodupadam (1963)
 Ammaye Kaanaan (1963)
 Thacholi Othenan (1964)... Kaduvancheri Yamman Kidavu
 Bhargavi Nilayam (1964)
 Aadyakiranangal (1964)
 Kochumon (1965)
 Chemmeen (1965)
 Ammu (1965)
 NGO (1967)
 Aval (1967)
 Ezhu Rathrikal (1968)
 Mooladhanam (1969)
 Nadhi (1969)
 Thriveni (1970)
 Nizhalattam (1970)
 Anadha Shilpangal (1971)
 Poompatta (1971)
 Oru Penninte Katha (1971)
 Karakanakadal (1971)
 Aabhijathyam (1971)
 Kandavarundo (1972)
 Manassu (1973)
 Chenda (1973)
 Maram (1973)
 Thulabharam (1973)
 Nellu (1974)
 Pathiravum Pakalvelichavum (1974)
 Vrindaavanam (1974)
 Thomasleeha (1975)
 Abhimaanam (1975)
 Chottanikkara Amma (1976)
 Vanadevatha (1976)
 Dweepu (1977)
 Varadakshina (1977)
 Aanandam Paramanandam (1977)
 Ormakal Marikkumo (1977)
 Enne Njan Thedunnu (1983)

References

External links
Kedamangalam Ali

Male actors from Kerala
Male actors in Malayalam cinema
Indian male film actors
1932 births
1986 deaths
20th-century Indian male actors